Martti Helde (born on 23 August 1987 in Rootsi, Kohila Parish) is an Estonian film director and screenwriter.

In 2015 he graduated from the Estonian Academy of Music and Theatre in theatrical leader speciality.

Filmography
 2013 	"Superbia" (feature film; director and screenwriter)
 2014 	"Ristuules" ("In the Crosswind") (feature film; director and screenwriter)
 2015 	"Kontakt" (feature film; director)
 2017 	"Kümme, üheksakümmend" (documental film; director)
 2018 	"Seltsimees laps" (feature film; director of mass scenes)
 2019 	"Skandinaavia vaikus" (feature film; director and screenwriter)

References

Living people
1987 births
Estonian film directors
Estonian screenwriters
Estonian cinematographers
Estonian Academy of Music and Theatre alumni
People from Kohila Parish